The Radom Air Show (International air shows – Radom Air Show) is a biannual celebration in the city of Radom, Poland, which began in 2000 (to continue in 2001, 2002, 2003 and then 2005). Every other year during the last weekend of August, military planes from the air forces of Europe and Russia gather in Radom for the show, which entertains visitors through elaborate stunts and performances from the aircraft. According to the authorities behind the show, its aim is to entertain the citizens of Radom and all of Poland, as well as to bring much needed investors to the city.

Since its founding, the Radom Air Show has become the most popular air show in Poland.

2007 AZL Żelazny mid-air collision

On 1 September 2007, three Zlin Z-526 aircraft from the AZL Żelazny aerobatics team were performing their display. One maneuver involved the three aircraft simultaneously flying toward a central point from different directions. Two of the aircraft, one piloted by Piotr Banachowicz and the other by the group's founder, Lech Marchelewski, struck each other at right angles, destroying both aircraft and killing both pilots.

2009 Belarusian Su-27 crash
On 30 August 2009, a Belarusian Sukhoi Su-27UBM (Number black 63) crashed while performing at the Radom show.

References

External links

Radom Air Show official webpage
Videos and photography from Airshow and AWAC in Radom (aviation.net.pl)

Air shows
Aviation in Poland
Festivals in Poland
Air show
Summer events in Poland
2000 establishments in Poland
Recurring events established in 2000